Takayoshi Sato (Japanese: 佐藤隆善, Hepburn: Satō Takayoshi) is a Japanese video game character designer, writer, and CGI director. Sato is best known as being a member of Team Silent from 1996 to 2003 and was responsible for creating the CGI cutscenes for Silent Hill and Silent Hill 2.

Biography
Sato was born and raised in Tokyo, Japan. Sato began studying Art at Tama Art University in 1992 and in 1996 received his bachelor's degree in oil painting.  

Konami visited Tama Art University campus in 1996 and Sato took 3 art tests and had 5 interviews with them prior to successfully being hired. During his first year he worked on the team that ported the arcade  cute 'em up Sexy Parodius to the Sega Saturn and Sony PlayStation. Sato described the experience as "hell", working 15 hour days 7 days per week. Sato began teaching himself how to 3D model and found many of his older colleagues at Konami frequently referring to him for assistance with this due to their lack of knowledge and inexperience. Sato did not receive credit for these referrals until he approached his superiors and requested that he be put on a major project such as Metal Gear Solid or Silent Hill to complete 3D animation work, otherwise he would keep his talent to himself. Subsequently, his superiors agreed and he commenced working on the original Silent Hill in September 1996. Sato was the sole member of Team Silent to work on the 3D cut-scenes in the first Silent Hill game, taking him nearly 2,000 hours to complete, and he spent much of this time sleeping under his office desk. Sato's work on the Silent Hill series has garnered him critical acclaim. In 1998 he received a Japanese cultural ministry award for his CGI direction and movie work and also received the personal CEO award from Konami.

After working as CGI director on both Silent Hill and its sequel, Sato pitched an idea for the third game in the series which never came to fruition. He left Konami in 2003 and joined Electronic Arts, working on character design for a cancelled Frogger game and Goldeneye: Rogue Agent.

Sato left Electronic Arts in 2007 to work at Virtual Heroes, a video game developer which specialises in serious games. Some of Sato's works included health education and hotel training video games. When Sato started working on serious games, he said, "I feel that games are being standardized into only a few formats lately: FPS, RTS, MMO, 3rd Person Action and Sports. There's a tendency to create the same games over and over with only a visual upgrade. And the only thing artists are supposed to do is "be professional" and gift-wrap the same game elements with a pretty new skin."

In 2011 he received the Advanced Character Animation degree. 

Sato has been employed at Nintendo since February 2012 working as a visual producer.

Works

References

External links

Year of birth missing (living people)
Japanese designers
Konami people
Living people
Nintendo people
Silent Hill